Edwards v. Vannoy, 593 U.S. ___ (2021), was a United States Supreme Court case involving the Court's prior decision in Ramos v. Louisiana, 590 U.S. ___ (2020), which had ruled that jury verdicts in criminal trials must be unanimous under the Sixth Amendment to the U.S. Constitution. The Supreme Court ruled 6–3 that Ramos did not apply retroactively to earlier cases prior to their verdict in Ramos.

Background

Under the Sixth Amendment to the U.S. Constitution, a person accused of criminal charges must be tried by a jury. Federal laws required the jury to come to a unanimous decision to achieve conviction, but states had been free to adapt their own requirements for conviction based on the 1972 case Apodaca v. Oregon. All but two states adopted the same unanimous jury conviction requirements as federal law; only Louisiana and Oregon allowed for majority jury votes to convict, as well as the Puerto Rico territory. In 2019, Louisiana altered its laws to require a unanimous jury conviction.

Ramos v. Louisiana was brought to the Supreme Court to challenge the Louisiana jury-majority conviction law prior to its change on the basis it was a Jim Crow law that allowed for racial discrimination. The Supreme Court ruled in a 6–3 decision in Ramos that the Sixth Amendment was an incorporated right to the states, and that the Louisiana and Oregon allowance for non-unanimous jury convictions was unconstitutional, overturning the Apodaca v. Oregon ruling. The decision had split across the typical ideological lines of the Justices, with Chief Justice John Roberts and Justices Samuel Alito and Elena Kagan dissenting.

In the present case, Thedrick Edwards was an African-American that was convicted in 2007 in Louisiana on charges of rape, armed robbery, and kidnapping. The jury convictions were all non-unanimous, and Edwards had claimed that the state had manipulated jury selection to minimize the minority representation on the jury; the lone black juror had voted against any convictions. Edwards had spent the intervening years challenging his conviction on the basis that Louisiana's non-unanimous jury conviction laws were unconstitutional and had petitioned to the Supreme Court prior to their Ramos decision on the same questions that Ramos had presented. Upon the Ramos ruling in April 2020, Edwards changed his petition to the Court to ask whether the Ramos decision should apply retroactively.

Supreme Court
The Court granted certiorari to Edwards' revised petition on the retroactivity of the Ramos decision in May 2020. 

Oral arguments were heard on December 2, 2020 via teleconference due to the ongoing COVID-19 pandemic. Observers found that the Justices were split over the retroactive application of their decisions. While most Supreme Court decision do not have retroactive applications, certain decisions have involved certain "watershed" rights to require retroactive application, such as the right to an attorney decided by Gideon v. Wainwright (372 U.S. 335 (1963)); the ability to apply decisions retroactively to cases involving watershed rights had been defined in principle in Teague v. Lane (489 U.S. 288 (1989)) but the Justices were unsure if there was a practical test to determine what are watershed rights.

The Court issued its decision on May 17, 2021. In a 6–3 ruling, the Court affirmed the lower court's ruling. The majority opinion was written by Justice Brett Kavanaugh and was joined by the conservative side of the court, finding that the Ramos decision did not apply retroactively. The majority's decision determined that the requirement for a unanimous jury vote was not sufficiently "watershed" as to require Ramos to be made retroactive. Kavanaugh wrote  "Continuing to articulate a theoretical exception that never actually applies in practice offers false hope to defendants, distorts the law, misleads judges, and wastes the resources of defense counsel, prosecutors, and courts." Kavanaugh wrote that the affected states were free to consider renewed trials for those affected cases on their own. In the opinion, Kavanaugh also suggested that it would be impossible for any future change in criminal court proceedings would ever reach the "watershed" factor defined in the Teague ruling, nor had any court change prior to Edwards had met the standard set in Teague for the "watershed" requirement. As such, Kavanaugh considered that that portion of the Teague ruling was overturned.

Justice Elena Kagan wrote the dissenting opinion joined by Justices Stephen Breyer and Sonia Sotomayor. Kagan wrote that "those convicted under rules found not to produce fair and reliable verdicts will be left without recourse in federal courts."

Later events
While the Supreme Court opted to not consider the Ramos decision to be retroactive, the Oregon Supreme Court ruled in December 2022 that the Ramos decision should be applied retroactively to cases within the state.

References

External links 
 

2021 in United States case law
United States Supreme Court cases
United States Supreme Court cases of the Roberts Court
United States habeas corpus case law